Vångavallen is a multi-purpose stadium in Trelleborg, Sweden.  It is currently used mostly for football matches and is the home stadium of Trelleborgs FF. The stadium was opened on 5 June 1933. It has a capacity of 7,400 spectators, 3,000 of which is seated.

References

External links

Football venues in Sweden
Trelleborgs FF
Multi-purpose stadiums in Sweden
Buildings and structures in Skåne County
1933 establishments in Sweden
Sports venues completed in 1933
Sport in Trelleborg
20th-century establishments in Skåne County